Luzhki is a rural locality (a settlement) in Klimovsky District, Bryansk Oblast, Russia. The population was 14 as of 2010. There is one street.

Geography 
Luzhki is located 21 km north of Klimovo (the district's administrative centre) by road. Lakomaya Buda is the nearest rural locality.

References 

Rural localities in Klimovsky District